"Cry Boy Cry" is a song by British new wave band Blue Zoo, released in 1982 as the third single from their 1983 debut album Two by Two. The song is the band's biggest hit, and their only top 40 entry, reaching No. 13 on the UK Singles Chart in October 1982. It also reached No. 25 in Ireland.

References

1982 songs
1982 singles
Magnet Records singles
British new wave songs
Song recordings produced by Tim Friese-Greene
Music videos directed by Tim Pope